The Contest 32 CS is a Dutch sailboat that was designed by Dick Zaal as an International Offshore Rule racer to Lloyd's rules and first built in 1978.

Production
The design was built by Contest Yachts, a division of Conyplex, in the Netherlands between 1978 and 1985. The company completed 100 examples of the type, but it is now out of production.

Design
The Contest 32 CS is a recreational keelboat, built predominantly of glassfibre, with wood trim. It has a masthead sloop rig or option ketch rig, a centre cockpit, a spooned raked stem, a vertical transom, a skeg-mounted rudder controlled by a wheel and a fixed fin keel. It displaces  and carries  of ballast.

The boat is fitted with a Swedish Volvo Penta MD 17C  diesel engine.

The accommodation includes an aft cabin with a double and single berth, two main cabin settees and a drop leaf table and a forward "V"-berth. The interior is finished in teak or mahogany wood.

The galley is amidships on the starboard side and includes a three-burner liquid petroleum gas stove. The head is to port, opposite the gallery and includes a shower. Hot and cold pressure water was a factory option. A navigation station is provided on the port side, forward of the head. All three cabins have ventilation hatches.

A second smaller steering wheel can be fitted on the forward port bulkhead allowing the boat to be used as a motorsailer. There is a bow anchor locker.

The mainsail has slab reefing. There are two genoa winches and a third mast-mounted winch for the halyards. A boom vang was a factory option.

See also
List of sailing boat types

Similar sailboats
Bayfield 30/32
B Boats B-32
Beneteau 323
Beneteau Oceanis 321
C&C 32
Columbia 32
Douglas 32
Hunter 32 Vision
Hunter 326
J/32
Mirage 32
Nonsuch 324
Ontario 32
Ranger 32
Watkins 32

References

Keelboats
1970s sailboat type designs
Sailing yachts
Sailboat type designs by Dick Zaal
Sailboat types built by Contest Yachts